Huston Quin (August 4, 1876 – August 14, 1938) was mayor of Louisville, Kentucky from 1921 to 1925.

Early life
Huston Quin was born on August 4, 1876, in Anchorage, Kentucky. Quin was educated in public schools in Louisville and received a law degree from the University of Louisville School of Law in 1900.

Career
Quin practiced law with the Louisville firm Helm & Bruce until 1908, when he became a city attorney. Quin was first assistant city attorney from 1909 to 1913. He left the position in 1912 to reenter private practice, but was appointed to the city attorney position in 1917. In 1918 he was elected to the Kentucky Court of Appeals.

He served as a judge until 1921, when he was elected Mayor of Louisville on the Republican ticket. As mayor he tried unsuccessfully to arrange funding for what became the Clark Memorial Bridge, and is credited as the mayor to start to push for the eventual Louisville to Jeffersonville, Indiana bridge.

He was the first mayor to appoint black officers to the Louisville Police Department and fire department, and oversaw the arrival of the first traffic lights to Downtown Louisville. He also helped develop a police call box system, pushed the fire department to become motorized, and organized the Public Utilities Bureau of the city. He helped the transition of the University of Louisville from various buildings around town to the Belknap Campus.

After his term as mayor, he served as president of Title Insurance & Trust Company until his death.

Personal life
Quin married Martha B. Rivers of Anchorage on June 9, 1904.

Quin died on August 14, 1938, at the Norton Memorial Infirmary in Louisville. He was buried in Resthaven Memorial Park.

References

1876 births
1938 deaths
Mayors of Louisville, Kentucky
University of Louisville School of Law alumni
Judges of the Kentucky Court of Appeals
Businesspeople from Louisville, Kentucky
Kentucky Republicans